The following outline is provided as an overview of and a topical guide to Brunei:

Brunei is a sovereign country located on the north coast of the Island of Borneo in Southeast Asia. Apart from its coastline with the South China Sea it is surrounded by the state of Sarawak, Malaysia, and is separated into two parts by Limbang, which is part of Sarawak.

Brunei, the remnant of a very powerful sultanate, regained its independence from the United Kingdom on 1 January 1984.

General reference

 Pronunciation:
 Common English country name:  Brunei or Brunei Darussalam
 Official English country name:  The State of Brunei, Abode of Peace
 Common endonym(s):  
 Official endonym(s):  
 Adjectival(s): Bruneian
 Demonym(s):
 ISO country codes: BN, BRN, 096
 ISO region codes: See ISO 3166-2:BN
 Internet country code top-level domain: .bn

Geography of Brunei 

Geography of Brunei
 Brunei is: a country, on an island
 Location:
 Northern Hemisphere and Eastern Hemisphere
 Eurasia (though not on the mainland)
 Asia
 Southeast Asia
 Maritime Southeast Asia
 on the Island of Borneo
 Time zone:  ASEAN Common Time (UTC+08:00)
 Extreme points of Brunei
 High:  Bukit Pagon 
 Low:  South China Sea 0 m
 Land boundaries:   381 km
 Coastline:  161 km
 Population of Brunei: 381,371(2008) - 170th most populous country

 Area of Brunei:  - 172nd
Atlas of Brunei

Environment of Brunei 

 Climate of Brunei
 Renewable energy in Brunei
 Protected areas of Brunei
 Wildlife of Brunei
 Fauna of Brunei
 Birds of Brunei
 Mammals of Brunei

Natural geographic features of Brunei 

 Rivers of Brunei

Regions of Brunei

Ecoregions of Brunei

Administrative divisions of Brunei 

Administrative divisions of Brunei
 Districts of Brunei (daerahs)
 Mukims of Brunei (mukims)

Districts of Brunei 

Districts of Brunei

Mukims of Brunei 

Mukims of Brunei
 Capital of Brunei: Bandar Seri Begawan
 Cities of Brunei

Demography of Brunei 

Demographics of Brunei

Government and politics of Brunei 

Politics of Brunei
 Form of government: absolute monarchy
 Capital of Brunei: Bandar Seri Begawan
 Elections in Brunei
 Political parties in Brunei

Branches of the government of Brunei 

Government of Brunei

Executive branch of the government of Brunei 
 Head of state: Sultan of Brunei
 Head of government: Sultan of Brunei (holds the title "Prime Minister of Brunei")
 Councils:
 Cabinet of Brunei (Council of Ministers)
 Legislative Council of Brunei (consultive only)

Legislative branch of the government of Brunei 

 Legislative Council of Brunei (unicameral, and consultive only)

Judicial branch of the government of Brunei 

Court system of Brunei

Foreign relations of Brunei 

Foreign relations of Brunei
 Diplomatic missions in Brunei
 Diplomatic missions of Brunei

International organization membership 
The State of Brunei, Abode of Peace, is a member of:

Asian Development Bank (ADB)
Asia-Pacific Economic Cooperation (APEC)
Asia-Pacific Telecommunity (APT)
Association of Southeast Asian Nations (ASEAN)
Association of Southeast Asian Nations Regional Forum (ARF)
Commonwealth of Nations
East Asia Summit (EAS)
Group of 77 (G77)
International Bank for Reconstruction and Development (IBRD)
International Civil Aviation Organization (ICAO)
International Criminal Police Organization (Interpol)
International Federation of Red Cross and Red Crescent Societies (IFRCS)
International Labour Organization (ILO)
International Maritime Organization (IMO)
International Mobile Satellite Organization (IMSO)
International Monetary Fund (IMF)
International Olympic Committee (IOC)
International Organization for Standardization (ISO) (correspondent)

International Red Cross and Red Crescent Movement (ICRM)
International Telecommunication Union (ITU)
International Telecommunications Satellite Organization (ITSO)
Islamic Development Bank (IDB)
Nonaligned Movement (NAM)
Organisation of Islamic Cooperation (OIC)
Organisation for the Prohibition of Chemical Weapons (OPCW)
United Nations (UN)
United Nations Conference on Trade and Development (UNCTAD)
United Nations Educational, Scientific, and Cultural Organization (UNESCO)
Universal Postal Union (UPU)
World Customs Organization (WCO)
World Federation of Trade Unions (WFTU)
World Health Organization (WHO)
World Intellectual Property Organization (WIPO)
World Meteorological Organization (WMO)
World Tourism Organization (UNWTO)
World Trade Organization (WTO)

Law and order in Brunei 

Law of Brunei
 Human rights in Brunei
 LGBT rights in Brunei
 Freedom of religion in Brunei
 Law enforcement in Brunei
 Bruneian nationality law

Military of Brunei 

Military of Brunei
 Command
 Commander-in-chief
 Forces
 Army of Brunei
 Navy of Brunei
 Air Force of Brunei

Local government in Brunei 

Local government in Brunei

History of Brunei 

History of Brunei

Culture of Brunei 

Culture of Brunei
 Cuisine of Brunei
 Languages of Brunei
 Media in Brunei
 National symbols of Brunei
 Coat of arms of Brunei
 Flag of Brunei
 National anthem of Brunei
 People of Brunei
 Prostitution in Brunei
 Public holidays in Brunei
 Religion in Brunei
 Christianity in Brunei
 Islam in Brunei
 unei: None

Art in Brunei 
 Music of Brunei

Sports in Brunei 

Sports in Brunei
 Football in Brunei
 Brunei at the Olympics

Economy and infrastructure of Brunei 

Economy of Brunei
 Economic rank, by nominal GDP (2007): 105th (one hundred and fifth)
 Communications in Brunei
 Internet in Brunei
 Companies of Brunei
Currency of Brunei: Dollar
ISO 4217: BND
 Energy in Brunei
 Tourism in Brunei
 Transport in Brunei
 Airports in Brunei

Education in Brunei 

Education in Brunei

See also

Brunei

Index of Brunei-related articles
List of Brunei-related topics
List of international rankings
Member state of the Commonwealth of Nations
Member state of the United Nations
Outline of Africa
Outline of geography

References

External links

 Government of Brunei Darussalam website
 Brunei. The World Factbook. Central Intelligence Agency.
 Brunei Tourism website
 The Daily Brunei Resources blog. Contains extra information on the country through the eyes of a Bruneian.

Brunei
Brunei